Arshad Sharif a Pakistani journalist who was shot and killed in Kajiado, Kenya, by local police on 23 October 2022. The Kenyan police described the shooting as a case of "mistaken identity", and there was speculation on social media that he had been assassinated. On 24 October, the Kenyan Independent Police Oversight Authority announced an investigation into Sharif's death. The late journalist's mother accused senior pakistani intelligence officers of their involvement in murder.
It is no secret that the mastermind behind this killing was former prime minister Nawaz Sharif, as Arshad Sharif was involved in the filming of a documentary exposing his corrupt practices.

Investigation committee 
The formation of an inquiry committee to look into the circumstances surrounding the murder of investigative journalist Arshad has been announced by Pakistan's Prime Minister Shehbaz Sharif on 26 October 2022.

According to a notification, the two-member committee made up of Athar Waheed, director of the Federal Investigation Agency's headquarters, and Umar Shahid Hamid, deputy director of the Intelligence Bureau, would travel to Kenya and present its findings to the Interior Ministry.

The investigation team in Kenya, met with the acting Kenyan police head and representatives of the Pakistan High Commission in Kenya to discuss the Arshad Sharif murder case. They had  recorded the testimony of two brothers Khurram Ahmed and Waqar Ahmed who had given the murdered journalist lodging and other services while he was in Kenya. The Kenyan authorities also received Sharif's iPad and smartphone.

The team that travelled to Kenya to look into the murder of journalist Arshad returned home on 8 November 2022, after doing their inquiry. while in Kenya, the investigating team gathered information about the Arshad Sharif case. The team received cooperation from the Pakistani embassy and foreign ministry for better fact-finding. The investigation team will give the interior ministry its report.

Judicial inquiry 
The Chief Justice of Pakistan (CJP), Umar Ata Bandial, has been asked by Prime Minister Shehbaz Sharif to set up a judicial committee to conduct a fair and reliable investigation into the murder of Sharif. The chief justice was requested by the prime minister to form a commission made up of all the highest courts' available judges to investigate the circumstances surrounding the journalist's murder. According to the letter, the panel might concentrate on the following five issues about the circumstances surrounding the murder:

 What steps did Sharif take to travel abroad in August 2022, and who made those arrangements?
 Was the threat made against Sharif known to any federal or provincial agencies, institutions, or administrations?
 What conditions and motives compelled Sharif to fly from the United Arab Emirates to Kenya?
 What actually happened during the shooting incident that resulted in Arshad Sharif's death?
 Is Sharif's death really the product of a misidentification or was it a "criminal game"?

The prime minister declared in this context that the federal government would provide the judicial commission with complete cooperation. After the murder, a commission made up of senior officials was dispatched to Kenya.

Reactions 
News of Sharif's killing was met with shock in Pakistan and abroad. The President of Pakistan Arif Alvi described Sharif's death as "a great loss to journalism and Pakistan". The Prime Minister of Pakistan Shehbaz Sharif described the killing as "shocking news". Former Prime Minister Imran Khan wrote on Twitter that he was "shocked at the brutal murder of Arshad Sharif who paid the ultimate price for speaking the truth - his life".

Afzal Butt, president of the Pakistan Federal Union of Journalists (PFUJ), expressed his grief at the news and called for an inquiry into the killing of Sharif. Journalist Kamran Khan questioned the government on Twitter and asked the Prime Minister to take "the nation in confidence".

A significant number of people attended Arshad Sharif's funeral prayers. Close friends and colleagues arrived at Sharif's home to express their condolences, including Imran Khan and Sheikh Rasheed Ahmad.

References 

2022 deaths
Deaths by firearm in Kenya
People shot dead by law enforcement officers in Kenya
Pakistani people murdered abroad
Pakistani murder victims